Medical Journal Armed Forces India is a quarterly peer-reviewed medical journal covering all disciplines of medical science. It is published by Elsevier on behalf of the Armed Forces Medical Services of India and the editor-in-chief is Col Rakesh Datta. The journal was established in 1945 as Journal of Indian Army Medical Corps, obtaining its current name in 1974.

Abstracting and indexing
The journal is abstracted and indexed in CAB Abstracts, Embase, and Scopus.

References

External links

General medical journals
Quarterly journals
Indian Army
Publications established in 1945
English-language journals